Pasiphilodes subpalpata is a moth in the  family Geometridae. It is found on Peninsular Malaysia and Borneo.

References

Moths described in 1958
Eupitheciini
Moths of Asia